DeWayne "Dewey" King (October 1, 1925 – April 13, 2021) was a former American football player, coach, and college athletics administrator.  He served as the head football coach at San Jose State University from 1970 to 1972 and at Wheaton College in Wheaton, Illinois from 1973 to 1979, compiling a career college football record of 39–54–1.  King was also the athletic director at Carroll University in Waukesha, Wisconsin.

Coaching career
King was the head football coach for San Jose State University from 1970 to 1972.  In 1973, he was named head football coach at Wheaton College in Wheaton, Illinois.  He held that position for seven seasons, from 1973 until 1979.  His coaching record at Wheaton was 29–34.

King was inducted into the North Dakota Sports Hall of Fame in 2008.  He is also a member of the University of North Dakota Hall of Fame.

From 1980 to 1985, King served as athletic director at Carroll University in Waukesha, Wisconsin.

Head coaching record

Notes

References

1925 births
2021 deaths
American football centers
American football linebackers
Carroll Pioneers athletic directors
Michigan State Spartans football coaches
North Dakota Fighting Hawks football coaches
North Dakota Fighting Hawks football players
Penn Quakers football coaches
Rutgers Scarlet Knights football coaches
San Jose State Spartans athletic directors
San Jose State Spartans football coaches
Wheaton Thunder football coaches
High school football coaches in Ohio
People from Towner County, North Dakota
Players of American football from North Dakota